The 1925 Oglethorpe Stormy Petrels football team was an American football team that represented Oglethorpe University in the Southern Intercollegiate Athletic Association (SIAA) during the 1925 college football season. In its second season under head coach Harry J. Robertson, the team compiled an 8–3 record (8–1 against SIAA opponents), won the SIAA championship, and outscored opponents by a total of 119 to 92.

Schedule

References

External links 

 

Oglethorpe
Oglethorpe Stormy Petrels football seasons
Oglethorpe Stormy Petrels football